Center Township is one of the eighteen townships of Columbiana County, Ohio, United States. The 2010 census reported 6,313 people living in the township, 3,525 of whom lived in the unincorporated portions of the township.

Geography
Located in the center of the county, it borders the following townships:
Salem Township - north
Fairfield Township - northeast corner
Elkrun Township - east
Madison Township - southeast corner
Wayne Township - south
Franklin Township - southwest
Hanover Township - west
Butler Township - northwest corner

One village is located in Center Township:
The county seat and village of Lisbon, in the east

Name and history

It is one of nine Center Townships statewide.
The township was among the first organized in the county in 1803. Center Township was named from its central position in Columbiana County.

Government
The township is governed by a three-member board of trustees, who are elected in November of odd-numbered years to a four-year term beginning on the following January 1. Two are elected in the year after the presidential election and one is elected in the year before it. There is also an elected township fiscal officer, who serves a four-year term beginning on April 1 of the year after the election, which is held in November of the year before the presidential election. Vacancies in the fiscal officership or on the board of trustees are filled by the remaining trustees.

Township Trustees
Greg Shive, Chairman
Rexford Underwood
Tim Novak

Fiscal Officer
Rebecca Tolson

References

External links
County website

Townships in Columbiana County, Ohio
1803 establishments in Ohio
Townships in Ohio